Repentance (literally, "return", pronounced tshuva or teshuva) is one element of atoning for sin in Judaism. Judaism recognizes that everybody sins on occasion, but that people can stop or minimize those occasions in the future by repenting for past transgressions. Thus, the primary purpose of repentance in Judaism is ethical self transformation.

A Jewish penitent is traditionally known as a baal teshuva.  A baal teshuva is even more revered in the Jewish tradition than a righteous person.

Repentance and creation
According to the Talmud, God created repentance before He created the physical universe, making it among the first things created. (Nedarim 39b).

When to repent
One should repent immediately. A parable is told in the Talmud (Shabbat 153a) that Rabbi Eliezer taught his disciples, "Repent one day before your death." The disciples politely questioned whether one can know the day of one's death, so Rabbi Eliezer answered, "All the more reason, therefore, to repent today, lest one die tomorrow." Because of Judaism's understanding of the annual process of Divine Judgment, Jews believe that God is especially open to repentance during the period from the beginning of the month of Elul through the High Holiday season, i. e., Rosh HaShanah (the Day of Judgement), Aseret Yimei Teshuva (the Ten Days of Repentance), Yom Kippur (the Day of Atonement), and, according to Kabbalah, Hoshana Rabbah. Another good time to repent is toward the end of one's life.

How to repent
Numerous guides to the repentance process can be found in rabbinical literature. See especially Maimonides' Rules of Repentance in the Mishneh Torah.

According to Gates of Repentance, a standard work of Jewish ethics written by Rabbenu Yonah of Gerona, a sinner repents by:

 regretting/acknowledging the sin;
 forsaking the sin (see below);
 worrying about the future consequences of the sin;
 acting and speaking with humility;
 acting in a way opposite to that of the sin (for example, for the sin of lying, one should speak the truth);
 understanding the magnitude of the sin;
 refraining from lesser sins for the purpose of safeguarding oneself against committing greater sins;
 confessing the sin;
 praying for atonement;
 correcting the sin however possible (for example, if one stole an object, the stolen item must be returned; or, if one slanders another, the slanderer must ask the injured party for forgiveness);
 pursuing works of chesed and truth;
 remembering the sin for the rest of one's life;
 refraining from committing the same sin if the opportunity presents itself again;
 teaching others not to sin.

Forsaking the sin

The second of Rabbenu Yonah's "Principles of Repentance" is "forsaking the sin" (Hebrew: עזיבת–החטא, azivat-hachet). After regretting the sin (Rabbenu Yonah's first principle), the penitent must resolve never to repeat the sin. However, Judaism recognizes that the process of repentance varies from penitent to penitent and from sin to sin. For example, a non-habitual sinner often feels the sting of the sin more acutely than the habitual sinner. Therefore, a non-habitual sinner will have an easier time repenting, because he or she will be less likely to repeat the sinful behavior.

The case of the habitual sinner is more complex. If the habitual sinner regrets his or her sin at all, that regret alone clearly does not translate into a change in behavior. In such a case, Rabbi Nosson Scherman recommends devising "a personal system of reward and punishment" and to avoid circumstances which may cause temptation toward the relevant sin. Rabbi Judah taught, "Who is the penitent whose repentance ascends until the Throne of Glory? — one who is tested and emerges guiltless" (Yoma 86b). Maimonides interpreted this statement to mean that the sign of a true penitent is one who commits a sin and is later given the opportunity to commit exactly the same sin, yet one chooses not to ("Laws of Repentance" 2:1).

Animal sacrifice and later substitutions

When the Temple in Jerusalem was active, a Jew was required to bring various sacrifices for certain types of sins, and to perform a version of the viduy confession ritual as part of the sacrificial ritual. Yet, even when the Holy Temple still stood, the mere act of bringing an offering never automatically caused God to forgive someone for their sins. The Tanakh (Hebrew Bible) teaches:

"In sacrifice and offering, you have not delighted, but you have given me an open ear. Burnt offering and sin offering you have not required." (Psalms 40:6)
"For you will not delight in sacrifice, or I would give it; you will not be pleased with a burnt offering. The sacrifices of God are a broken spirit; a broken and contrite heart, O God, you will not despise." (Psalms 51:16-17)
"For I desire steadfast love, and not sacrifice, the knowledge of God, rather than burnt offerings." (Hosea 6:6)
"Take with you words and return to the LORD; say to him, 'Take away all iniquity; accept what is good, and we will pay with bulls the vows of our lips.'" (Hosea 14:2)

Many places Rabbinic literature emphasizes that performing charitable deeds, praying, and studying Torah are more meritorious than animal sacrifice, and that the former can replace animal sacrifice when the Temple is not active:

"Rabbi Yochanan ben Zakkai was walking with ... Rabbi Yehoshua, ... after the destruction of the Temple. Rabbi Yehoshua looked at the Temple ruins and said, ' ... The place that atoned for the sins of the people Israel lies in ruins!' Then Rabbi Yohannan ben Zakkai spoke to him these words of comfort: '... We can still gain ritual atonement through deeds of loving-kindness.'" (Midrash Avot D'Rabbi Nathan 4:5)
"Rabbi Elazar said: Doing righteous deeds of charity is greater than offering all of the sacrifices, as it is written: 'Doing charity and justice is more desirable to the Lord than sacrifice'." (Babylonian Talmud, Sukkah 49)
"Rabbi Shmuel bar Nahmani said: The Holy One Said to David: 'Solomon, your Son is building the Temple. Is this not for the purpose of offering sacrifices there? The justice and righteousness of your actions are more precious to me than sacrifices.' And how do we know this? 'To do what is right and just is more desirable to Adonai than sacrifice.' (Proverbs 21:3)" (Talmud Yerushalmi, B'rakhot 2.1)
"One who does teshuvah is considered as if he went to Jerusalem, rebuilt the Temple, erected the altar, and offered all the sacrifices ordained by the Torah. [For the Psalm says], 'The sacrifices of God are a broken spirit; a broken and contrite heart, O God, You will not despise [51:19]'" (Leviticus Rabbah 7:2 (Midrash))
"Rava said: Whoever studies Torah does not need [to sacrifice offerings] (Menahot 110a) ... Said God: In this world, a sacrifice effected their atonement, but in the World to Come, I will forgive your sins without a sacrifice." (Midrash Tanhuma Shemini, paragraph 10)
"Even if a man has sinned his whole life, and repents on the day of his death, all his sins are forgiven him" (Maimonides, Yad, Teshuvah 2:1)

Examples
In 609 BC King Josiah of Israel was killed in battle by Pharaoh Necho II; Josiah's death was brought about because despite his sincere religious reform, he had in fact been deceived as the people did not follow his reforms; thus he refused to heed the Prophet Jeremiah, thinking that no sword would pass through the Land of Israel. He was struck by 300 darts; he made no complaint except to acknowledge "The Lord is righteous, for I rebelled against His commandment. 
After Passover in AD 44, Herod Agrippa went to Caesarea, where he had games performed in honour of Claudius. In the midst of his speech to the public a cry went out that he was a god, and Agrippa did not then publicly react. At this time he saw an owl perched over his head. During his imprisonment by Tiberius a similar omen had been interpreted as portending his speedy release and future kingship, with the warning that should he behold the same sight again, he would die. He was immediately smitten with violent pains, scolded his friends for flattering him and accepted his imminent death in a state of Teshuva. He experienced heart pains and a pain in his abdomen, and died after five days.

See also

 Baal teshuva
 Baal teshuva movement
 Elul
 Forgiveness
 Jewish Ethics
 Orthodox Jewish outreach
 Rabbi
 Seven Laws of Noah
 Tawbah, a similar concept in Islam
 Penance, a similar concept in Christianity
 Yeshiva

References

Theological dictionary of the Old Testament: Vol.14 p473 G. Johannes Botterweck, Helmer Ringgren, Heinz-Josef Fabry - 2004 "The noun t'suba occurs 4 times in the Dtr History, twice in the Chronicler's History and in Job."
Jacob J. Petuchowski, The Concept of 'Teshuva' in the Bible and Talmud, Judaism 17 (1968), 175–185.

External links
 "Repentance" at Jewish Virtual Library
 Repentance in the Jewish Encyclopedia

 
Jewish law and rituals
Judaism and society
Repentance